Nerodia paucimaculata, commonly known as the Concho water snake, is a species of mostly aquatic, nonvenomous snake in the family Colubridae. The species is endemic to Texas in the United States.

Geographic range
N. paucimaculata is found only in west-central Texas in the Colorado and Concho river systems, in Coke, Runnels, San Saba, and Tom Green Counties.

Conservation status
Due to its limited range, N. paucimaculata was considered a threatened species in the state of Texas.

Taxonomy
N. paucimaculata was originally considered to be a subspecies of the Brazos water snake, N. harteri, but was elevated to full species status by Densmore et al. in 1992.

Description
The Concho water snake grows to a total length (including tail) of 16 to 32 inches (41–81 cm), and looks very much like N. harteri. However, N. paucimaculata tends to be more red in color, and has no dark markings on the underside.

References

Further reading
Powell R, Conant R, Collins JT (2016). Peterson Field Guide to Reptiles and Amphibians of Eastern and Central North America, Fourth Edition. Boston and New York: Houghton Mifflin Harcourt. xiv + 494 pp., 47 plates, 207 figures. . (Nerodia paucimaculata, p. 419).
Tinkle DW, Conant R (1961). "The Rediscovery of the Water Snake, Natrix harteri, in Western Texas, with the Description of a New Subspecies". Southwestern Naturalist 6 (1): 33-44. (Natrix harteri paucimaculata, new subspecies)

External links

Herps of Texas: Nerodia paucimaculata

paucimaculata
Reptiles of the United States
Endemic fauna of Texas
Reptiles described in 1961